Sir John Scott  (24 April 1878 – 19 January 1946) was a British colonial administrator. Scott joined the Ceylon Civil Service as a cadet in 1901 before retiring as Colonial Secretary of the Straits Settlement in 1933.

Education
John Scott was educated at Leeds Grammar School, Bath College and King's College, Cambridge, where he took his B.A. degree.

Career
Scott joined the Ceylon Civil Service in November 1901, was appointed principal assistant colonial secretary in April 1917  and have been in Ceylon till 1921 when he was appointed Deputy Chief Secretary of Nigeria.

Between 1924 and 1928, he was the Chief Secretary of Tanganyika Territory and acting Governor (1924 – 5 March 1925)

He was appointed as Colonial Secretary of Straits Settlements in 1929. During his tenure as Colonial Secretary of Straits Settlements, he was sworn in as Deputy-Governor for several occasions during the absence from the Settlement of H. E. Governor. In October 1929, Scott was again sworn in as Officer Administering the Government as Sir Hugh Clifford whose sudden decision to resign from the post of Governor of Straits Settlement. This is due to Lady Clifford's gravely illness and had to leave for England. Scott resumed his post as Colonial Secretary of Straits Settlements when Sir Cecil Clementi sworn in as Governor of Straits Settlement on 5 February 1930. On 23 May 1933, Scott retired and hand over the post of Colonial Secretary of Straits Settlements to Andrew Caldecott.

Post-retirement
Scott and his wife resided at Manor House, Hartford, Huntingdon after Scott's retirement in 1933.

Personal life
John Scott was born on 24 April 1878 and is the eldest son of Canon John Scott of Hull, Leeds. He married Mary Kathrine Adams, daughter of Francis Adams of Greswold, Worcestershire in 1905 and Mary died in 1941.
He died on 19 January 1946.

Awards and honours
John Scott was invested with Companion of the Most Distinguished Order of St. Michael and St. George (CMG) in 1923 and Knight Commander of the Most Excellent Order of the British Empire (KBE) in 1932.

 Companion of Order of St Michael and St George (CMG) (1923)
 Knight Commander of the Order of the British Empire (KBE) - Sir (1932)

References

1878 births
1946 deaths
Administrators in British Singapore
Chief Secretaries of Singapore
Companions of the Order of St Michael and St George
Knights Commander of the Order of the British Empire
Governors of the Straits Settlements
British people in British Ceylon